Atepomarus in Celtic Gaul was a healing god. Mauvières (Indre), Apollo was associated with this god in the form Apollo Atepomarus.

At some of Apollo's healing sanctuaries (as at Sainte-Sabine, Burgundy) small figurines of horses were associated with him.

Names and etymology
The title also appears as Atepomerus.

Scholarship suggests the name is a compound of at- (intensifier), -epo- (the Celtic word for "horse") and -marus ("large, great"). Thus, the epithet is sometimes translated as "Great Horseman" or "possessing a great horse".

Pierre-Yves Lambert rejects his connection with horses and suggests an etymology based on *ad-tepo, related to 'protection, refuge'.

Role

As founder
A character named Atepomarus appears with a Momoros (fr) as a pair of Celtic kings and founders of Lugdunum. They escape from Sereroneus and arrive at a hill. Momorus, who had skills in augury, sees a murder of crows and names the hill Lougodunum, after the crows. This myth is reported in the works of Klitophon of Rhodes and in Pseudo-Plutarch's De fluviis.

As a theonym
The name appears as a theonym attached to Graeco-Roman deities Apollo and Mercurius. An inscription of Apollo Atepomarus was found in Mauvières, tied to the Gallic tribe of the Bituriges.

References

Bibliography 
 Dictionary of Celtic Myth and Legend. Miranda Green. Thames and Hudson Ltd. London. 1997
 Animals in Celtic Life and Myth, Miranda Green, Routledge.

Further reading

External links
 Atepomarus at celtnet

Gaulish gods
Health gods